Lentinula guarapiensis is a species of agaric fungus in the family Marasmiaceae that is found in Paraguay. Originally described by Carlos Luigi Spegazzini in 1883 as Agaricus guarapiensis, it was moved to the genus Lentinula by David Pegler in 1983. It is only known from the type collection.

References

External links

Fungi described in 1883
Fungi of Paraguay
Taxa named by Carlo Luigi Spegazzini